Syntomidopsis is a genus of moths in the subfamily Arctiinae.

Species
 Syntomidopsis gundlachiana Neumoegen, 1890
 Syntomidopsis variegata Walker, 1854

References

Natural History Museum Lepidoptera generic names catalog

Arctiinae